Walsh Cup may refer to:

 The Walsh Cup (hurling), a competition in Ireland
 The Walsh Cup (rowing), a contest in the United States